Phytoecia basirufipennis is a species of beetle in the family Cerambycidae. The scientific name of this species was first published in 1954 by Breuning, as Blepisanis basirufipennis. It was later transferred to Phytoecia when Blepisanis was reclassified as a subgenus.

References

basirufipennis
Beetles described in 1954